The Billboard Hot 100 is a chart that ranks the best-performing singles of the United States. Published by Billboard magazine, the data are compiled by Nielsen SoundScan based collectively on each single's weekly physical and digital sales, and airplay. In 2007, 17 singles reached the top spot on the chart. An 18th single, Beyoncé's "Irreplaceable", began a run at the top in 2006 which continued into 2007.

In 2007, eight acts achieved their first US number-one single, either as a lead artist or featured guest: Mims, Avril Lavigne,  Maroon 5, T-Pain, Yung Joc, Plain White T's, Sean Kingston, and Soulja Boy Tell 'Em. Producer Timbaland earned his first number-one single as lead artist with "Give It to Me"; he had previously appeared as featured guest on singer Nelly Furtado's number-one single "Promiscuous". T-Pain, Justin Timberlake, Nelly Furtado and Fergie each earned two number-one singles, either as a lead artist or featured guest.

Three number-one singles tied for the longest run on the chart in 2007: Beyoncé's "Irreplaceable", Rihanna's "Umbrella", and Soulja Boy Tell 'Em's "Crank That (Soulja Boy)" all topped the chart for seven weeks; the last of these was non-consecutive. However, "Irreplaceable", which started its peak position in three issues the previous year, is credited to by Billboard magazine as 2006's longest-running single. To this effect, "Umbrella" and "Crank That (Soulja Boy)" are the longest-running singles of 2007. Other singles with extended chart runs include singer Alicia Keys' "No One" which stayed at number one for five straight weeks.

"Irreplaceable" is the best-performing single of the calendar year, topping the Year-End Hot 100 singles of 2007 for seven consecutive weeks. Band Maroon 5's "Makes Me Wonder" is noted for its jump from 64th to 1st place on the Billboard Hot 100, making it the largest leap of 2007. "Umbrella", which occupied the top slot for seven of summer's thirteen weeks, has been credited by the music press as 2007's Song of the Summer.

Chart history

Number-one artists

See also
2007 in music
List of Billboard number-one singles
Billboard Year-End Hot 100 singles of 2007

References

Additional sources
Fred Bronson's Billboard Book of Number 1 Hits, 5th Edition
Joel Whitburn's Top Pop Singles 1955-2008, 12 Edition
Joel Whitburn Presents the Billboard Hot 100 Charts: The 2000s
Additional information obtained can be verified within Billboards online archive services and print editions of the magazine.

United States Hot 100
2007